Erich Seligmann Fromm (March 23, 1900 – March 18, 1980) was a German social psychologist, psychoanalyst, sociologist, humanistic philosopher, and democratic socialist. He was a German Jew who fled the Nazi regime and settled in the US. He was one of the founders of The William Alanson White Institute of Psychiatry, Psychoanalysis and Psychology in New York City and was associated with the Frankfurt School of critical theory.

Life
Erich Fromm was born on March 23, 1900, at Frankfurt am Main, the only child of Orthodox Jewish parents, Rosa (Krause) and Naphtali Fromm. He started his academic studies in 1918 at the University of Frankfurt am Main with two semesters of jurisprudence.  During the summer semester of 1919, Fromm studied at the University of Heidelberg, where he began studying sociology under Alfred Weber (brother of the better known sociologist Max Weber), psychiatrist-philosopher Karl Jaspers, and Heinrich Rickert. Fromm received his PhD in sociology from Heidelberg in 1922 with a dissertation "On Jewish Law".

Fromm at the time became strongly involved in Zionism, under the influence of the religious Zionist rabbi Nehemia Anton Nobel.  He was very active in Jewish Studentenverbindungen and other Zionist organisations.
But he soon turned away from Zionism, saying that it conflicted with his ideal of a "universalist Messianism and Humanism".

During the mid-1920s, he trained to become a psychoanalyst through Frieda Reichmann's psychoanalytic sanatorium in Heidelberg. They married in 1926, but separated shortly after and divorced in 1942. He began his own clinical practice in 1927. In 1930 he joined the Frankfurt Institute for Social Research and completed his psychoanalytical training.

After the Nazi takeover of power in Germany, Fromm moved first to Geneva and then, in 1934, to Columbia University in New York. Together with Karen Horney and Harry Stack Sullivan, Fromm belongs to a Neo-Freudian school of psychoanalytical thought. Horney and Fromm each had a marked influence on the other's thought, with Horney illuminating some aspects of  psychoanalysis for Fromm and the latter elucidating sociology for Horney. Their relationship ended in the late 1930s. After leaving Columbia, Fromm helped form the New York branch of the Washington School of Psychiatry in 1943, and in 1946 co-founded the William Alanson White Institute of Psychiatry, Psychoanalysis, and Psychology. He was on the faculty of Bennington College from 1941 to 1949, and taught courses at the New School for Social Research in New York from 1941 to 1959.

When Fromm moved to Mexico City in 1949, he became a professor at the National Autonomous University of Mexico (UNAM) and established a psychoanalytic section at the medical school there. Meanwhile, he taught as a professor of psychology at Michigan State University from 1957 to 1961 and as an adjunct professor of psychology at the graduate division of Arts and Sciences at New York University after 1962. He taught at UNAM until his retirement, in 1965, and at the Mexican Society of Psychoanalysis (SMP) until 1974. In 1974 he moved from Mexico City to Muralto, Switzerland, and died at his home in 1980, five days before his eightieth birthday. All the while, Fromm maintained his own clinical practice and published a series of books.

Fromm was reportedly an atheist but described his position as "nontheistic mysticism".

Psychological theory
Beginning with his first seminal work of 1941, Escape from Freedom (known in Britain as The Fear of Freedom), Fromm's writings were notable as much for their social and political commentary as for their philosophical and psychological underpinnings. Indeed, Escape from Freedom is viewed as one of the founding works of political psychology. His second important work, Man for Himself:  An Inquiry into the Psychology of Ethics, first published in 1947, continued and enriched the ideas of Escape from Freedom. Taken together, these books outlined Fromm's theory of human character, which was a natural outgrowth of Fromm's theory of human nature. Fromm's most popular book was The Art of Loving, an international bestseller first published in 1956, which recapitulated and complemented the theoretical principles of human nature found in Escape from Freedom and Man for Himself—principles which were revisited in many of Fromm's other major works.

Central to Fromm's world view was his interpretation of the Talmud and Hasidism. He began studying Talmud as a young man under Rabbi J. Horowitz and later under Rabbi Salman Baruch Rabinkow, a Chabad Hasid. While working towards his doctorate in sociology at the University of Heidelberg, Fromm studied the Tanya by the founder of Chabad, Rabbi Shneur Zalman of Liadi. Fromm also studied under Nehemia Nobel and Ludwig Krause while studying in Frankfurt. Fromm's grandfather and two great-grandfathers on his father's side were rabbis, and a great uncle on his mother's side was a noted Talmudic scholar.  However, Fromm turned away from orthodox Judaism in 1926, towards secular interpretations of scriptural ideals.

The cornerstone of Fromm's humanistic philosophy is his interpretation of the biblical story of Adam and Eve's exile from the Garden of Eden.  Drawing on his knowledge of the Talmud, Fromm pointed out that being able to distinguish between good and evil is generally considered to be a virtue, but that biblical scholars generally consider Adam and Eve to have sinned by disobeying God and eating from the Tree of Knowledge. However, departing from traditional religious orthodoxy on this, Fromm extolled the virtues of humans taking independent action and using reason to establish moral values rather than adhering to authoritarian moral values.

Beyond a simple condemnation of authoritarian value systems, Fromm used the story of Adam and Eve as an allegorical explanation for human biological evolution and existential angst, asserting that when Adam and Eve ate from the Tree of Knowledge, they became aware of themselves as being separate from nature while still being part of it.  This is why they felt "naked" and "ashamed":  they had evolved into human beings, conscious of themselves, their own mortality, and their powerlessness before the forces of nature and society, and no longer united with the universe as they were in their instinctive, pre-human existence as animals.  According to Fromm, the awareness of a disunited human existence is a source of guilt and shame, and the solution to this existential dichotomy is found in the development of one's uniquely human powers of love and reason. However, Fromm distinguished his concept of love from unreflective popular notions as well as Freudian paradoxical love (see the criticism by Marcuse below).

Fromm considered love an interpersonal creative capacity rather than an emotion, and he distinguished this creative capacity from what he considered to be various forms of narcissistic neuroses and sado-masochistic tendencies that are commonly held out as proof of "true love". Indeed, Fromm viewed the experience of "falling in love" as evidence of one's failure to understand the true nature of love, which he believed always had the common elements of care, responsibility, respect, and knowledge.  Drawing from his knowledge of the Torah, Fromm pointed to the story of Jonah, who did not wish to save the residents of Nineveh from the consequences of their sin, as demonstrative of his belief that the qualities of care and responsibility are generally absent from most human relationships. Fromm also asserted that few people in modern society had respect for the autonomy of their fellow human beings, much less the objective knowledge of what other people truly wanted and needed.

Fromm believed that freedom was an aspect of human nature that we either embrace or escape. He observed that embracing our freedom of will was healthy, whereas escaping freedom through the use of escape mechanisms was the root of psychological conflicts. Fromm outlined three of the most common escape mechanisms:
Automaton conformity: changing one's ideal self to conform to a perception of society's preferred type of personality, losing one's true self in the process; Automaton conformity displaces the burden of choice from self to society;
Authoritarianism: giving control of oneself to another. By submitting one's freedom to someone else, this act removes the freedom of choice almost entirely.
Destructiveness: any process which attempts to eliminate others or the world as a whole, all to escape freedom. Fromm said that "the destruction of the world is the last, almost desperate attempt to save myself from being crushed by it".

The word biophilia was frequently used by Fromm as a description of a productive psychological orientation and "state of being".  For example, in an addendum to his book The Heart of Man:  Its Genius For Good and Evil, Fromm wrote as part of his humanist credo:

"I believe that the man choosing progress can find a new unity through the development of all his human forces, which are produced in three orientations.  These can be presented separately or together: biophilia, love for humanity and nature, and independence and freedom."

Erich Fromm postulated eight basic needs:

Fromm's thesis of the "escape from freedom" is epitomized in the following passage.  The "individualized man" referenced by Fromm is man bereft of the "primary ties" of belonging (such as nature, family, etc.), also expressed as "freedom from":

Five basic orientations

In his book Man for Himself Fromm spoke of "orientation of character".  He differentiates his theory of character from that of Freud by focusing on two ways an individual relates to the world. Freud analyzed character in terms of libido organization, whereas Fromm says that in the process of living, we relate to the world by: 1) acquiring and assimilating things—"Assimilation", and 2) reacting to people—"Socialization". Fromm asserted that these two ways of relating to the world were not instinctive, but an individual's response to the peculiar circumstances of his or her life; he also believed that people are never exclusively one type of orientation. These two ways of relating to life's circumstances lead to basic character-orientations.

Fromm lists four types of nonproductive character orientation, which he called receptive, exploitative, hoarding, and marketing, and one positive character orientation, which he called productive. Receptive and exploitative orientations are basically how an individual may relate to other people and are socialization attributes of character. A hoarding orientation is an acquiring and assimilating materials/valuables character trait. The marketing orientation arises in response to the human situation in the modern era. The current needs of the market determine value. It is a relativistic ethic. In contrast, the productive orientation is an objective ethic. Despite the existential struggles of humanity, each human has the potential for love, reason and productive work in life. Fromm writes, "It is the paradox of human existence that man must simultaneously seek for closeness and for independence; for oneness with others and at the same time for the preservation of his uniqueness and particularity. ...the answer to this paradox – and to the moral problems of man – is productiveness."

Fromm's influence on other notable psychologists
Fromm's four non-productive orientations were subject to validation through a psychometric test, The Person Relatedness Test by Elias H. Porter, PhD in collaboration with Carl Rogers, PhD at the University of Chicago's Counseling Center between 1953 and 1955.  Fromm's four non-productive orientations also served as basis for the LIFO test, first published in 1967 by Stuart Atkins, Alan Katcher, PhD, and Elias Porter, PhD and the Strength Deployment Inventory, first published in 1971 by Elias H. Porter, PhD. Fromm also influenced his student Sally L. Smith who went on to become the founder of the Lab School of Washington and the Baltimore Lab School.

Critique of Freud
Fromm examined the life and work of Sigmund Freud at length. Fromm identified a discrepancy between early and later Freudian theory: namely that, prior to World War I, Freud had described human drives as a tension between desire and repression, but after the end of the war, began framing human drives as a struggle between biologically universal Life and Death (Eros and Thanatos) instincts.  Fromm charged Freud and his followers with never acknowledging the contradictions between the two theories.

Fromm also criticized Freud's dualistic thinking. According to Fromm, Freudian descriptions of human consciousness as struggles between two poles were narrow and limiting.  Fromm also condemned Freud as a misogynist unable to think outside the patriarchal milieu of early 20th century Vienna. However, in spite of these criticisms, Fromm nonetheless expressed a great respect for Freud and his accomplishments. Fromm contended that Freud was one of the "architects of the modern age", alongside Albert Einstein and Karl Marx, but emphasized that he considered Marx both far more historically important than Freud and a finer thinker.

Political ideas and activities
Fromm's best known work, Escape from Freedom, focuses on the human urge to seek a source of authority and control upon reaching a freedom that was thought to be an individual's true desire. Fromm's critique of the modern political order and capitalist system led him to seek insights from medieval feudalism. In Escape from Freedom, he found value in the lack of individual freedom, rigid structure, and obligations required on the members of medieval society:

The culmination of Fromm's social and political philosophy was his book The Sane Society, published in 1955, which argued in favor of a humanistic and democratic socialism. Building primarily upon the early works of Karl Marx, Fromm sought to re-emphasise the ideal of freedom, missing from most Soviet Marxism and more frequently found in the writings of libertarian socialists and liberal theoreticians. Fromm's brand of socialism rejected both Western capitalism and Soviet communism, which he saw as dehumanizing, and which resulted in the virtually universal modern phenomenon of alienation. He became one of the founders of socialist humanism, promoting the early writings of Marx and his humanist messages to the US and Western European public.

In the early 1960s, Fromm published two books dealing with Marxist thought (Marx's Concept of Man and Beyond the Chains of Illusion: My Encounter with Marx and Freud). In 1965, working to stimulate the Western and Eastern cooperation between Marxist humanists, Fromm published a series of articles entitled Socialist Humanism: An International Symposium.  In 1966, the American Humanist Association named him Humanist of the Year.

For a period, Fromm was also active in U.S. politics. He joined the Socialist Party of America in the mid-1950s, and did his best to help them provide an alternative viewpoint to McCarthyist trends in some US political thought. This alternative viewpoint was best expressed in his 1961 paper May Man Prevail? An Inquiry into the Facts and Fictions of Foreign Policy. However, as a co-founder of SANE, Fromm's strongest political activism was in the international peace movement, fighting against the nuclear arms race and U.S. involvement in the Vietnam War. After supporting Senator Eugene McCarthy's losing bid for the Democratic presidential nomination, Fromm more or less retreated from the American political scene, although he did write a paper in 1974 entitled Remarks on the Policy of Détente for a hearing held by the U.S. Senate Committee on Foreign Relations. Fromm was awarded the Nelly Sachs Prize in 1979.

Criticism
In Eros and Civilization, Herbert Marcuse is critical of Fromm: In the beginning, he was a radical theorist, but later he turned to conformity. Marcuse also noted that Fromm, as well as his close colleagues Sullivan and Karen Horney, removed Freud's libido theory and other radical concepts, which thus reduced psychoanalysis to a set of idealist ethics, which only embrace the status quo. Fromm's response, in both The Sane Society and in The Anatomy of Human Destructiveness, argues that Freud indeed deserves substantial credit for recognizing the central importance of the unconscious, but also that he tended to reify his own concepts that depicted the self as the passive outcome of instinct and social control, with minimal volition or variability. Fromm argues that later scholars such as Marcuse accepted these concepts as dogma, whereas social psychology requires a more dynamic theoretical and empirical approach. In reference to Fromm's leftist political activism as a public intellectual, Noam Chomsky said "I liked Fromm's attitudes but thought his work was pretty superficial".

Works

Early work in German

 Das jüdische Gesetz. Ein Beitrag zur Soziologie des Diaspora-Judentums. Promotion, 1922. .
 Über Methode und Aufgaben einer analytischen Sozialpsychologie. Zeitschrift für Sozialforschung, Bd. 1, 1932, S. 28–54.
 Die psychoanalytische Charakterologie und ihre Bedeutung für die Sozialpsychologie. Zeitschrift für Sozialforschung, Bd. 1, 1932, S. 253–277.
 Sozialpsychologischer Teil. In: Studien über Autorität und Familie. Forschungsberichte aus dem Institut für Sozialforschung. Alcan, Paris 1936, S. 77–135.
 Zweite Abteilung: Erhebungen (Erich Fromm u.a.). In: Studien über Autorität und Familie. Forschungsberichte aus dem Institut für Sozialforschung. Alcan, Paris 1936, S. 229–469.
 Die Furcht vor der Freiheit, 1941 (In English, "Fear/Dread of Freedom"). 
 Psychoanalyse & Ethik, 1946. 
 Psychoanalyse & Religion, 1949.  (The Dwight H. Terry Lectureship 1949/1950)

Later works in English
 Escape from Freedom (US), The Fear of Freedom (UK) (1941) 
 Man for himself, an inquiry into the psychology of ethics (1947) 
 Psychoanalysis and Religion (1950) 
 The Forgotten Language; an introduction to the understanding of dreams, fairy tales, and myths (1951) 
 The Sane Society (1955) 
 The Art of Loving (1956) 
 Sigmund Freud's mission; an analysis of his personality and influence (1959)
 Zen Buddhism and Psychoanalysis (1960) 
 May Man Prevail? An inquiry into the facts and fictions of foreign policy (1961) 
 Marx's Concept of Man (1961) 
 Beyond the Chains of Illusion: my encounter with Marx and Freud (1962) 
 The Dogma of Christ and Other Essays on Religion, Psychology and Culture (1963) 
 The Heart of Man, its genius for good and evil (1964) 
 Socialist Humanism (1965)
 You Shall Be as Gods: a radical interpretation of the Old Testament and its tradition (1966) 
 The Revolution of Hope, toward a humanized technology (1968) 
 The Nature of Man (1968) 
 The Crisis of Psychoanalysis (1970) 
 Social character in a Mexican village; a sociopsychoanalytic study (Fromm & Maccoby) (1970) 
 The Anatomy of Human Destructiveness (1973) 
 To Have or to Be? (1976) 
 Greatness and Limitation of Freud's Thought (1979) 
 On Disobedience and other essays (1981) 
 For the Love of Life (1986) 
 The Art of Being (1993) 
 The Art of Listening (1994) 
 On Being Human (1997)

See also
 American philosophy
 Ernst Simmel
 Group narcissism
 List of American philosophers
 Psychoanalytic sociology
 Psychohistory

Explanatory notes

References

Further reading 
 De Rodrigo, Enrique, Neoliberalismo y otras patologías de la normalidad. Conversando nuestro tiempo con Erich Fromm. Madrid: PenBooks, 2015. . (Spanish)
 Friedman, Lawrence J., The Lives of Erich Fromm: Love's Prophet. New York: Columbia University Press, 2013. .
 Funk, Rainer, Erich Fromm: His Life and Ideas An Illustrated Biography. Continuum: New York, 2000. .
 Funk, Rainer, "Life and Work of Erich Fromm", Logos, 6:3, Summer 2007
 Ghislain Deslandes, "Escape from freedom: Revisiting Erich Fromm in the light of Contemporary Authoritarianism", Organization Studies (journal), 2018.
 Jensen, Walter A., Erich Fromm's contributions to sociological theory. Kalamazoo, MI: Printmill, 2017. .

External links

 
 erich-fromm.de – Erich Fromm Archives; Literary Estate
 International Erich Fromm Society 
 Erich Fromm online – Official website about Erich Fromm, his Life and Work: Documents, information about the Institute, Study Center, Foundation, Literary Estate and events.
 International Foundation Erich Fromm 
 1958 Mike Wallace interview , hrc.utexas.edu
 Интервью с Майком Уоллесом: в гостях Эрих Фромм, 1958 Mike Wallace interview  
 FBI file on Erich Fromm
 Fear from Freedom Chapter V "Mechanisms of Escape from Freedom", Erich Fromm (1942)
 Erich Fromm at the Encyclopædia Britannica

1900 births
1980 deaths
20th-century German philosophers
20th-century psychologists
Narcissism writers
American anti-capitalists
American atheists
American democratic socialists
American ethicists
American expatriates in Switzerland
American humanists
American Marxists
American social psychologists
Analysands of Hanns Sachs
Anti-consumerists
Articles containing video clips
Columbia University faculty
European democratic socialists
Frankfurt School
Freudo-Marxism
German anti-capitalists
German anti–nuclear weapons activists
German atheists
German humanists
German male writers
German psychoanalysts
German psychologists
Heidelberg University alumni
History of psychiatry
Jewish psychoanalysts
Jewish psychologists
Jewish American social scientists
Jewish atheists
Jewish emigrants from Nazi Germany to the United States
Jewish humanists
Jewish philosophers
Jewish socialists
Marxist humanists
Marxist theorists
Marxist writers
Michigan State University faculty
Academic staff of the National Autonomous University of Mexico
New York University alumni
Philosophers of love
Writers from Frankfurt